Vandana may refer to:

 Vandana Gupte, Marathi actress
 Vandana Jain, Indian ophthalmologist
 Vandana Shanbagh (born 1963), Indian athlete
 Vandana Shiva (born 1952), Indian environmental activist
 Vandana Singh, Indian science fiction writer
 Vandana (moth), a genus of moths of the family Erebidae
 Vandana (film)